Bengt Bornström (born 6 June 1934 – 2007) was a Swedish ice hockey player. Bornström was part of the Djurgården Swedish champions' team of 1958.

References

1934 births
2007 deaths
Djurgårdens IF Hockey players
Swedish ice hockey players